Mark S. Nixon is an author, researcher, editor and an academic. He is the former president of IEEE Biometrics Council, and former vice-Chair of IEEE PSPB. He retired from his position as Professor of Electronics and Computer Science at University of Southampton in 2019.

Nixon’s main research interests include using gait and ear as biometrics and using soft biometrics for identification. He has served the International Association for Pattern Recognition (IAPR) in several offices. Nixon has authored 4 books including Feature Extraction and Image Processing for Computer Vision , Human Identification based on Gait and Introductory Digital Design. He has around 20,000 citations.

Nixon became a BMVA Distinguished Fellow in 2015. He is a Fellow of the International Association of Pattern Recognition.

Education 
Nixon graduated from University of Reading in BSc Cybernetics Science with Subsidiary Mathematics in 1979. He completed his doctoral studies in Applied Estimation Theory from the same university in 1983.

Career 
Nixon joined University of Southampton in 1983 and became a Professor of Electronics and Computer Science; he was awarded Personal Chair in 2001 and retired in 2019.

Nixon has held several leadership and management positions over the course of his career. He was appointed as President of the IEEE Biometrics Council from 2017 to 2018. He was appointed as Chair of the International Association of Pattern Recognition (IAPR), while also serving as member of Nominating Committee and Advisory Committee. He has been serving as the vice-Chair IEEE PSPB since 2018. He is an advisory editor for Pattern Recognition Letters.

Research 
Nixon’s research on biometrics and computer science has continued nearly 40 years, pioneering human gait as a biometric and joining the pioneers of the use of ears in biometrics. In his initial work with face recognition, his team applied new techniques for shape extraction and description and more recently formulated them for moving objects. This research is also applied to medical imagery and in remotely–sensed image analysis. Nixon’s research approaches operate on spatial images, video and in 3D.

Nixon's later research was focused on mechanisms that seek to cross the semantic gap and to learn human descriptions from computer vision features and conversely to learn image features from human descriptions; also using soft biometrics where the use of human descriptions for biometrics purpose is pioneered. In the recent years, Nixon and his team have described how subjects can be recognized by human descriptions (attributes) of their body, face and their clothing. Nixon’s work of fusion of soft biometrics leads to the identification and search for subjects in video material and also has an impact on the eyewitness procedures.

Nixon has also worked into developing a new approach to analyze acceleration in image sequences based on the fact that most approaches to analyzing velocity actually subsume many types of motion. By separating out acceleration, a new capability can be observed, e.g. rotational acceleration to find a walking subject’s feet, as well as new capability to detect violent actions since acceleration is innate to such acts.

Nixon was featured in the IAPR newsletter and in ‘Biometric Technology Today’ in 2016. His work received extensive media coverage in 2018 when it was applied in an egregious case in Australia to identify a subject who cased a shop and then murdered its owner.

Nixon’s book Feature Extraction and Image Processing for Computer Vision published in 2002 was the first book concentrating solely on the topic. He was awarded the Notable Book Award by the Computing Reviews in 2012 for his work in the book. According to Elisa Smith from IAPR newsletter, the book contains “a broad overview of the field presented at a level of depth aimed at those who are new to the field”. The book is praised for its citation of “an overwhelming and impressive number of books, conference, and journal articles on a broad range of topics”. She also stated that this book could be used “as a good framework to facilitate a broad range of discussion topics”.

Awards and honors
2008 - Fellow, International Association of Pattern Recognition (IAPR)
2012 - Notable Book Award, Computing Reviews
2015 - BMVA Distinguished Fellow

Bibliography

Books
D'oh! Fourier: Theory, Applications, And Derivatives - 2021
Introductory Digital Design - A Programmable Approach - 1995
Feature Extraction and Image Processing for Computer Vision - 4th Edition, 2019
Human identification based on gait, MS Nixon, T Tan, R Chellappa – 2010
Digital Electronics: A Primer - 2015
Handbook of Biometric Anti-Spoofing: Trusted Biometrics under Spoofing Attacks

Selected articles
D. Cunado, M. S. Nixon and J. N. Carter, Automatic Extraction and Description of Human Gait Models for Recognition Purposes, Computer Vision and Image Understanding, 90(1), pp. 1–41, 2003
D. J. Hurley, M. S. Nixon and J. N. Carter, Force Field Feature Extraction for Ear Biometrics, Computer Vision and Image Understanding,  98(3), pp. 491–512, 2005
D. Cunado, M. S. Nixon and J. N. Carter, Using Gait as a Biometric, via Phase-Weighted Magnitude Spectra, In: J Bigun, G. Chollet and G. Borgefors Eds.: Lecture Notes in Computer Science, 1206 (Proceedings of 1st Int. Conf. on Audio- and Video-Based Biometric Person Authentication AVBPA97), pp. 95–102, 1997
J. D. Shutler, M. G. Grant, M. S. Nixon, and J. N. Carter, On a Large Sequence-Based Human Gait Database, A. Lotfi, J. M. Garibaldi Eds., Applications in Science and Soft Computing, Springer, pp. 339–346, 2003 
M. S. Nixon, J. N. Carter, M. G. Grant, L. G. Gordon and J. B. Hayfron-Acquah,  Automatic Recognition by Gait: Progress and Prospects, Sensor Review, 23(4), 323-331, 2003
S. R. Gunn and M. S. Nixon, A Robust Snake Implementation; A Dual Active Contour, IEEE Transactions on Pattern Analysis and Machine Intelligence, 19(1), pp. 63–67, 1997
S. V. Stevenage, M. S. Nixon and K. Vince, Visual Analysis of Gait as a Cue to Identity, Applied Cognitive Psychology, 13(6), pp. 513–526, 1999
D. K. Wagg and M. S. Nixon, On Automated Model-Based Extraction and Analysis of Gait, IEEE Face and Gesture Analysis ‘04, Seoul (Korea), pp. 11–16, 2004
A. J. Tatem, H. G. Lewis, P. Atkinson and M. S. Nixon, Super-Resolution Land Cover Pattern Prediction using a Hopfield Neural Network, Remote Sensing of Environment, 79(1), pp. 1–14, 2002 
J. B. Hayfron-Acquah, M. S. Nixon and J. N. Carter Automatic Gait Recognition by Symmetry Analysis, Pattern Recognition Letters, 24(13), 2175-2183, 200 (Invited from AVBPA 2001)
P. S. Huang, C. J. Harris and M. S. Nixon, Recognising Humans by Gait via Parametric Canonical Space, Proc. International ICSC Workshop on Engineering of Intelligent Systems EIS’98, 3, pp. 384–389, 1998
P. S. Huang, C. J. Harris and M. S. Nixon, Human Gait Recognition in Canonical Space using Temporal Templates, IEE Proceedings Vision Image and Signal Processing, 146(2), pp. 93–100, 1999

References

Living people
1958 births
Fellows of the International Association for Pattern Recognition
British engineers
Alumni of the University of Reading